Dhanwar may refer to:

 Dhanwar Rai language, spoken in Nepal and Sikkim
 Dhanwar, Giridih, a town in Jharkhand, India
 Dhanwar (community development block), Khori Mahuwa subdivision, Giridih district, Jharkhand
 Dhanwar (Vidhan Sabha constituency), Jharkhand